Chieșd is a commune located in Sălaj County, Crișana, Romania. It is composed of three villages: Chieșd, Colonia Sighetu Silvaniei (Szilágyszigettelep) and Sighetu Silvaniei (Szilágysziget).

Sights 
 Wooden Church in Sighetu Silvaniei, built in the 17th century (1632), historic monument
 Wooden Church in Chieșd, built in the 18th century, historic monument

References

Communes in Sălaj County
Localities in Crișana